Nummi (Swedish: Nummis) is a former municipality in the Uusimaa region of Finland. In 1981, Nummi merged with Pusula to form the municipality of Nummi-Pusula. In 2013, Nummi-Pusula in turn merged with the city of Lohja, and nowadays the Nummi village centre is the 103rd district of Lohja. Before the 1981 merger, the neighbouring municipalities of Nummi were Kiikala, Lohja, Pusula, Sammatti, Somero (until 1977, Somerniemi), Suomusjärvi and Vihti.

History 
In the 17th century, Nummi was part of the Lohja parish and had its own churchyard. In 1822, a new stone church was built in the neoclassical style by the shore of Lake Pitkäjärvi. In 1843, Nummi separated from Lohja to become an independent municipality.

The Finnish Heritage Agency has recorded over a hundred relics found in the Nummi and Pusula area. Most of these items are from the Stone Age. The Nummi village centre and church area together are a nationally valuable built environment protected by law.

Notable people

Localities 
The main population centres of Nummi are Nummi village centre (around the church) and Saukkola.

The hamlets of Nummi are: Haarla, Hakula, Heijala, Heimola, Huhti, Hyrsylä, Hyvelä, Immola, Jakova, Järvenpää, Jättölä, Korkianoja, Kovela, Leppäkorpi, Luttula, Maikkala, Maskila, Mettula, Miemola, Millola, Mommola, Mäntsälä, Nummi, Näkkilä, Oinola, Oittila, Pakkala, Pälölä, Raatti, Remala, Rettlahti, Röhkölä, Salo, Saukkola, Sierla, Sitarla, Tavola, Varttila and Vivola.

Nature 
The largest water systems in Nummi are lake Pitkäjärvi, which is connected to Nummi river, and Lake Valkerpyy which is connected to Lake Lohja.

The cultivated Nummi river valley is a nationally valuable and protected area.

References 

Populated places in Finland
Former municipalities of Finland
Lohja